The Odwira festival is celebrated by the chiefs and peoples of Fanteakwa District and Akuapem in the Eastern Region of Ghana. The Odwira Festival is celebrated by the people of Akropong-Akuapim, Aburi, Larteh, and Mamfe. This is celebrated annually in the month of September and October. The festival celebrates a historic victory over the Ashanti in 1826. This was the battle of Katamansu near Dodowa. It was first celebrated in October 1826. 

This was during the reign of the 19th Okuapimhene of Akropong, Nana Addo Dankwa (I) from 1811 to 1835. It is a time of spiritual purification where the people are renewed and receive protection. It is also celebrated by the people of Jamestown in Accra. This is due to the associations formed through the intermarriages of the Ga and Akuapem people.

Customarily, the scheduling of the festival occur simultaneously  with the reaping season when there is bumper food; during which gratitude is shown to the Ancestors by the people. Being a yam  festival, thanksgiving for the bumper reap is principally demonstrated in the "giving food to the ancestors".

References

Festivals in Ghana